The 2012 Chinese Artistic Gymnastics Championships were held from 8 May to 12 May 2012 in Shanghai.

Men's event medal winners

Women's event medal winners

Team

All-around

Vault

Uneven bars

Balance beam

Floor exercise 

Chinese Artistic Gymnastics Championships
2012 in Chinese sport
Chinese Artistic Gymnastics Championships